Postřižín is a municipality and village in Mělník District in the Central Bohemian Region of the Czech Republic. It has about 1,700 inhabitants.

Notable people
František Janda-Suk (1878–1955), discus thrower, the first Czech Olympic medalist

Gallery

References

Villages in Mělník District